Elvira of Castile (before 1082?–1151) was a countess consort of Toulouse.
 
She was the illegitimate daughter of Alfonso VI of León and Castile, by his mistress Jimena Muñoz, and full sister of Theresa, Countess of Portugal. She married, firstly, Raymond IV, Count of Toulouse in 1094, being mother of count Alfonso Jordan.

Elvira accompanied Raymond on the First Crusade in 1096, and was present at the siege of Tripoli, where she gave birth to their son. It appears that the couple separated before the death of Raymond.

Elvira returned to Castile. Her son became the monarch of Tripoli upon the death of Raymond in 1105, but Elvira is not mentioned as present in Tripoli. In Castile, before 1117, she married Count Fernando Fernández de Carrión, having three additional children: Diego, García and Teresa Fernández, who was a wife of Count Osorio Martínez.

Notes 

11th-century births
Year of birth unknown
1151 deaths
Countesses of Toulouse
Countesses of Tripoli
11th-century French women
12th-century French women
12th-century French people
Illegitimate children of Alfonso VI
Christians of the First Crusade
Daughters of emperors
Daughters of kings